Joe Micon (born March 29, 1958) is an American politician who served as a member of the Indiana House of Representatives for the 26th district from 2004 to 2008.

Early life and education 
Micon was born in Niagara Falls, New York. After graduating from La Salle High School, he earned an Associate of Arts degree from Niagara County Community College, Bachelor of Arts in applied sociology from Purdue University, and Master of Social Work from Indiana University–Purdue University Indianapolis.

Career 
Micon served as a member of the Indiana House of Representatives from 2004 to 2008. He also worked for the Lafayette Urban Ministry for 40 years, including as the organization's executive director.

References 

Living people
Purdue University alumni
Indiana University–Purdue University Indianapolis alumni
People from Niagara Falls, New York
People from Niagara County, New York
1958 births
People from Lafayette, Indiana
People from Tippecanoe County, Indiana
American social workers
Democratic Party members of the Indiana House of Representatives